"You Are Unstoppable" is a song by Austrian pop singer Conchita Wurst. The song was released as a single on 20 February 2015 on radio, and was included on her debut studio album released in May 2015. The song was made available on Amazon.com on 5 March and released as CD single on 6 March. It also served as the official anthem of the 2015 CONCACAF Gold Cup.

Background and release
Musically, "You Are Unstoppable" combines orchestral elements of baroque pop with electropop elements.

The single was first premiered on radio on 20 February in Austria and first performed live on 5 March at Unser Song für Österreich, the German national final for the Eurovision Song Contest 2015.

Wurst devoted "You Are Unstoppable" to her fan base and used it as a statement for tolerance. Stating, "This song is for all the unstoppables. I devote this tune to everybody who shares the love and respect of their heart with the world." "You Are Unstoppable" deals with tolerance and the fight against discrimination.

Track listing
Digital download
 "You Are Unstoppable" – 3:30

Remixes – EP
 "You Are Unstoppable" (Phunkstar Remix) – 6:39
 "You Are Unstoppable" (Drums of Death Remix) – 5:43
 "You Are Unstoppable" (7th Heaven Remix) – 7:35
 "You Are Unstoppable" (LTBC Remix) – 5:17

Charts

References

2015 singles
2014 songs
Conchita Wurst songs